Manuchehri's Turkish harpist is a poem by the 11th-century Persian royal court poet Manuchehri. It is also known as  "In praise of the Espahbad Manuchehr son of Qabus", or Qasida no. 39 in the collected works of Manuchehri.

The poem is a qasīda (praise poem) in the Arabic style, consisting of 30 or 31 verses, all with the same rhyme. The first ten lines praise the beauty and skill of a harpist who is playing at the autumn festival of Mehrgan. Lines 11–16 describe the fierceness and warlike qualities of Manuchehr, to whom the poem is addressed, and lines 17–23 describe the ruler's splendid war horse. The poet goes on to encourage Manuchehr to enjoy the feast and ends with a prayer that his career will continue to be successful and glorious.

As with many of Manuchehri's poems he expresses his delight in the feast and the joys of life.

Historical background
Manuchehri's patron, after whom he took his pen-name Manuchehri, Manuchehr son of Qabus, was ruler of the region of Tabaristan, also known as Mazandaran, on the south side of the Caspian Sea. Manuchehr was not completely independent, but was a vassal of Sultan Mahmud of Ghazni (d. 1030). The title Espahbad or Espahbod was given to an army commander or minor ruler not directly appointed by the Sultan, but who was a vassal like Manuchehr or his father. The title goes back to pre-Islamic times.

Manuchehr died c. 1030, so the poem was evidently written therefore before this date. Sometime after Manuchehr's death, Manuchehri migrated to Ghazni (in present day Afghanistan) where he became a court poet to Mahmud's son, Mas'ud I of Ghazni.

The poem was written to celebrate Mehrgān (also pronounced Mehregān or Mehragān), an autumn festival dating back to pre-Islamic times which is held 195 days after the spring festival of Nowruz.

Sex of the harpist
The sex of the harpist is not completely clear. Although harpists were often illustrated as female, yet the instrument was also played by men: both Rudaki and Manuchehri's contemporary Farrokhi are said to have been excellent harpists.

Take off, o Turk, and throw aside these clothes of war!
Pick up the harp and put down the shield and sword from your hand!

Both Kazimirski and the author of EIr (2004) translate Manuchehri's poem as if the harpist is male, and this also accords with the Arabic masculine adjective  "beloved" used in verse 4, as opposed to the feminine .

The poem
The first ten verses of the poem are shown below. The transcription shows the modern Iranian pronunciation. The letter x is used for kh (as in Khayyam), q for both qeyn and ghāf; " ' " is a glottal stop.

The metre of the poem is known as ramal; in Elwell-Sutton's classification 2.4.15 (see Persian metres). In most lines there is a break or caesura after the 7th syllable, but in some lines the break is after the 8th or 6th. The pattern is as follows (– = long syllable, u = short syllable):
 – u – – – u – – – u – – – u –

Overlong syllables (which take up the position of long plus a short in the metrical pattern) are underlined.

1

Do you see that Turk who, when he strikes his hand on the harp
the stone (which lies on) the heart of devotees flees for a hundred leagues?

2

He breaks on his lovers' horse of love the over-strap of patience
whenever he pulls, on his own horse, the strap of horsehair tight.

3

His harp in his hand is just like a bent lover, 
with crying and wailing and groaning and sobbing.

4

A lover who has bound up his soul on his flanks;
and has bound his load tight from the curly-haired head of his beloved.

5

As if an Ethiopian has placed his hand in his hand
and has cut off both of his own hands for him like a cripple.(?)

6

And those finger tips of his on his silk threads
have a very amazing shaking and a very rapid to-ing and fro-ing.

7

He is like a Greek silk-weaver in the midst of his workshop
in the midst of making a brocade the colour of oranges.

8

When listening to his harp one must drink new wine;
wine is delicious especially at Mehrgan with the music of the harp.

9

Wine is delicious at any concert, but at Mehrgan
at a concert of a harp, even more delicious is wine shining like the rays of the sun.

10

Mehrgan is the festival of Fereidun, and honours him.
A new Azar is needed and a drinking of wine without sorrow.

Notes on individual verses

Verse 1
The word  has several meanings: (1) a harp; (2) a hand with fingers bent; (3) anything crooked or bent; (4) the talon of a bird or claws of a wild animal; (5) a person crippled in hand or foot.

Kazimirski translates  (literally, a stone) as "the stone which weighs on the heart" and "the burden of his griefs". The author of EIr (2004) translates it as "self-restraint".

A farsang, which Ancient Greek authors called a parasang, is a unit equivalent to the distance travelled in an hour, still used today. In modern times it is defined as a distance of 6 km (about 3.7 miles), but in the past it varied with the terrain. The European equivalent was the league.

Verse 2
The word  also has several meanings. These include (1) narrow, straight, tight; (2) a horse-girth or strap for fastening on a load; (3) half a load (as much as is carried upon one side of an animal).

 is the upper strap or over-strap used for tying on a load.

The harp is seen metaphorically as a horse which the player is riding. The strings of a harp were often made of horsehair. "Since harp strings were usually made of horsehair, Manūčehrī likens a harp to a horse “with its head up and its mane down”.

Verse 4
It is a frequent metaphor of Persian love poetry that the curly locks of the beloved keep the lover in bondage. Boys as well as girls had long locks. E. G. Browne relates a story of how Sultan Mahmud cut off the locks of his favourite slave boy Ayaz when drunk and was in a very bad mood the following day.

Verse 5
The meaning of this verse is obscure. Kazimirski suggests that it means that "an Ethiopian (a race known to be constantly joyful) has put his hand in the harpist's and is moving it so rapidly over the instrument that the hands appear to be invisible, as if they have been cut off." However, this is not certain. The word  is the word generally used in Persian poetry for a negro or black man.

Verse 7
Rūm was the name given to the remnant of the former Roman empire (by this time Greek-speaking) in Asia Minor (modern Turkey), hence  means "Greek" or from Asia Minor. In the Middle Ages, the brocades woven by Byzantine weavers were famous. (See Brocade#Byzantium.)

 is a citrus fruit or orange, such as even today commonly grows in Mazandaran Province; it is also a kind of cucumber.

Verse 8
Mehregan is a Zoroastrian autumn festival which at this period was celebrated as widely as Now Ruz, but later, after the Mongol invasions (13th century), became less popular. It was particularly associated with the Zoroastrians. At this time the Zoroastrian religion still had many followers in the Caspian Sea provinces.

Verse 9
Kazimirski translates  as "shining like blood". Dehkhoda's dictionary quotes this verse as an example of the meaning "rays of the sun".

Verse 10
Fereidun was a mythical ancient Iranian king, whose life is described in Ferdowsi's Shahnameh. He is said to have ruled for 500 years.

Azar in the Iranian calendar is the last month of autumn, corresponding to October–November.

See also
 Manuchehri
 Chang (instrument)

Bibliography
 Browne, E. G. (1906). A Literary History of Persia. Vol 2, chapter 2, especially pp. 153–156. 
 Clinton, Jerome W. (1972). The divan of Manūchihrī Dāmghānī; a critical study. (Minneapolis: Bibliotheca Islamica.)
 "EIr" (2004, updated 2012). "Homosexuality in Persian literature". Encyclopaedia Iranica.
 Elwell-Sutton, L. P. (1975)."The Foundations of Persian Prosody and Metrics". Iran, vol 13. (Available on JSTOR).
 Kazimirski, A. de Biberstein (1886). Manoutchehri: Poète persan du 11ème siècle de notre ère (du 5ième de l'hégire): Texte, traduction, notes, et introduction historique. Paris. Klincksieck. (Another copy, dated 1887). This poem is no. XXVIII, with a French translation on pp. 205–6 and notes on pp. 360–362.
 Lawergren, Bo (2003, updated 2012). "Harp". Encyclopaedia Iranica online.
 Mallah, Hosayn-Ali (1990). "Čang". Encyclopaedia Iranica online.
 Rypka, Jan (1967). History of Iranian Literature. Reidel Publishing Company. ASIN B-000-6BXVT-K

References

External links
 A Persian harp played by Tomoko Sugawara.
 Talk and demonstration of harp-playing by Rabe'eh Zand.

Persian poems
Medieval Persian literature
11th-century poems